Monkey flower can refer to:

Several genera of plant family Phrymaceae, including:
 Diplacus
 Erythranthe
 Mimulus
Various snapdragon-like Lamiales, including:
 Linaria vulgaris
 Phyllocarpus septentrionalis, monkey-flower tree

See also
 Monkey orchid